Gymnasura semilutea is a moth in the subfamily Arctiinae. It is found in Taiwan and China.

The wingspan is 15–20 mm. Adults are on wing in June.

References

Moths described in 1911
Nudariina
Moths of Asia
Moths of Taiwan